The Harry W. Bolens House is a historic house located at 842 West Grand Street in Port Washington, Wisconsin.

Description and history 
Built in 1910, the -story house once served as the home of State Senator Harry W. Bolens. The house was added to the National Register of Historic Places on August 25, 1983.

References

Houses in Ozaukee County, Wisconsin
Houses completed in 1910
Houses on the National Register of Historic Places in Wisconsin
National Register of Historic Places in Ozaukee County, Wisconsin